Gabon has competed in eight Summer Olympic Games. They have never competed in the Winter Olympic Games.
On August 11, 2012, Gabon won its first Olympic medal when Anthony Obame took silver in Taekwondo (men's +80 kg weight class) at the 2012 Summer Olympics.

Medal tables

Medals by Summer Games

Medals by sport

List of medalists

See also
 List of flag bearers for Gabon at the Olympics
 Gabon at the Paralympics

External links